Marcia Ashton (born 1 July 1932 in Sheffield, England) is an actress best known for her soap opera roles as Lily in Compact and as Jean Crosby in Brookside.

She has made numerous other television appearances including; EastEnders, Father, Dear Father, The Brothers, On the Buses, Upstairs, Downstairs, The Bill, Rumpole of the Bailey, Footballers' Wives and Holby City. She has also appeared on the West End stage and on Broadway. Her Shakespearian roles include Titania in A Midsummer Night's Dream.

References

External links

English television actresses
English soap opera actresses
Living people
1932 births